"Immortal, Invisible, God Only Wise" is a Christian hymn with words by the Free Church of Scotland minister, Walter Chalmers Smith, usually sung to the tune, "St. Denio", originally a Welsh ballad tune, which became a hymn (under the name "Palestrina") in  ("Hymns of the Sanctuary", 1839) edited by John Roberts (1822–1877).  Of this hymn, musicologist Erik Routley has written:

"[Immortal, Invisible] should give the reader a moment's pause.  Most readers will think they know this hymn, the work of another Free Kirk minister.  But it never now appears as its author wrote it, and a closer look at it in its fuller form shows that it was by no means designed to be one of those general hymns of praise that the parson slams into the praise-list when he is in too much of a hurry to think of anything else but a hymn about the reading of Scripture.  Just occasionally editorial tinkering changes the whole personality of a hymn; it has certainly done so here."

Lyrics

Lyrics given in most English hymnals:

Original version of last two stanzas from Hymns of Christ and the Christian Life, 1867.

References

External links
The text and tune at Oremus Hymnal

Scottish Christian hymns
Protestant hymns